Leptatherina is a genus of silversides, one freshwater and one marine, native to Australia.

Species
The currently recognized species in this genus are:
 Leptatherina presbyteroides (J. Richardson, 1843)
 Leptatherina wallacei (Prince, Ivantsoff & Potter, 1982) (western hardyhead)

References

Atherininae